Theenaalangal is a 1980 Indian Malayalam film, directed by J. Sasikumar. The film stars Jayan, Sheela, Ravikumar and Seema in the lead roles. Its musical score is by M. K. Arjunan.

Cast
Jayan as Ramu
Sheela as Devamma
Ravikumar as Babu (Police Officer)
Seema as Raji
Master Raghu
Janardhanan as Madhavan/Raja Shekaran (Double Roll)
 C. I. Paul as Robert
 K. P. A. C. Sunny as Damodaran Master
 Prathapachandran as Priest
 Maniyanpilla Raju as Appu Servant
 Thodupuzha Radhakrishnan
 Poojappura Ravi as Kunjappan
 Sadhana
 G.K. Pilla
 Peethambaran
 Sukumaran
 Bapukutty
 Sebastiann Kariyil
 Vanchiyoor Radha
 Cherthala Thankam
 Cherthala Sumathi

Soundtrack
The music was composed by M. K. Arjunan.

References

External links
 

1980 films
1980s Malayalam-language films
Films directed by J. Sasikumar